Big Horn or Bighorn may refer to:

 Bighorn sheep, a species native to North America

Places

Canada
 Bighorn, British Columbia
 Bighorn Dam, Alberta
 Bighorn River (Alberta)
 Bighorn Wildland Provincial Park, a proposed park in Alberta
 Big Horn 144A, an Indian reserve in Alberta
 Municipal District of Bighorn No. 8, a municipal district in Alberta

United States
 Big Horn, Wyoming
 Big Horn County, Montana
 Big Horn County, Wyoming
 Big Horn (Washington), a peak in the state of Washington
 Bighorn Mountain, in Nebraska
 Bighorn Mountains, in Wyoming and Montana
 Bighorn Mountains (California), in San Bernardino County
 Bighorn Basin, in Wyoming and Montana
 Bighorn Canyon National Recreation Area, in Wyoming and Montana
 Bighorn National Forest, in Wyoming
 Bighorn Lake, in Wyoming and Montana
 Bighorn River, in Wyoming and Montana

Other uses
 USS Big Horn (AO-45), a US Navy tanker 1942–1946
 USS Big Horn (T-AO-198), a US Navy fleet replenishment oiler since 1992
 Big Horn, Manchester, a public sculpture in Manchester, England
 Big Horn Academy Building, a school in Cowley, Wyoming, US
 Big Horn Hotel, a demolished historic building in Arminto, Wyoming, US
 The Big Horn, a 1979 album by Houston Person
 Bighorn Airways, an American charter company
 Bighorn Fire, a 2020 wildfire near Tucson, Arizona, US
 Isuzu Bighorn, or Isuzu Trooper, an SUV

See also
Little Bighorn (disambiguation)